Walshia is a genus of moths in the family Cosmopterigidae.

Species
Walshia albicornella Busck, 1914
Walshia amorphella Clemens, 1864
Walshia calcarata Walsingham, 1909
Walshia detracta Walsingham, 1909
Walshia dispar Hodges, 1961
Walshia elegans Hodges, 1978
Walshia exemplata Hodges, 1961
Walshia floridensis Hodges, 1978
Walshia miscecolorella (Chambers, 1875) (syn: Walshia miscecalonella Chambers, 1875)
Walshia particornella (Busck, 1919)
Walshia pentapyrga (Meyrick, 1922)
Walshia similis Hodges, 1961

References
Natural History Museum Lepidoptera genus database

Chrysopeleiinae